Salari (also Romanized as Sālārī) is a village in Belharat Rural District, Miyan Jolgeh District, Nishapur County, Razavi Khorasan Province, Iran. At the 2006 census, its population was 783, in 214 families.

References 

Populated places in Nishapur County